Trillium angustipetalum, with the common name is narrowpetal wakerobin, is a species of Trillium, plants which may be included within the Liliaceae (lily family) or the newer family Melanthiaceae.

Description
They are green and mottled with brownish or darker green spots.

Each stem produces one flower, which is held on top of the bracts.

Taxonomy
In 1856, John Torrey described Trillium sessile var. angustipetalum based on a specimen collected by John Milton Bigelow two years earlier in California. In 1975, John Daniel Freeman described the species Trillium angustipetalum based on Torrey's variety. The epithet angustipetalum means "narrow-petaled".

Distribution
The plant is native to northern and central California and southwestern Oregon, where it occurs in forests, woodlands, chaparral, and riparian zones. It is found in the Klamath Mountains, western Sierra Nevada foothills, and Outer Southern California Coast Ranges.

Bibliography

References

External links

 Jepson Manual eFlora (TJM2) treatment of Trillium angustipetalum
 Biodiversity Information Serving Our Nation (BISON): occurrence data + maps for Trillium angustipetalum
 
 
 

angustipetalum
Flora of California
Flora of Oregon
Flora of the Klamath Mountains
Flora of the Sierra Nevada (United States)
Endemic flora of the United States
Natural history of the California chaparral and woodlands
Natural history of the California Coast Ranges
Plants described in 1857
Taxa named by John Torrey